Lotus cytisoides is a species of perennial herb in the family Fabaceae. They have a self-supporting growth form and compound, broad leaves. Individuals can grow to 0.11 m.

Sources

References 

cytisoides
Flora of Malta